Heugimja-juk or black sesame porridge is a Korean porridge, or juk, made from finely ground black sesame and rice. The bittersweet, nutty porridge is good for recovering patients, as black sesame seeds are rich in digestive enzymes that help with healthy liver and kidney functions.

Preparation 
Preparation of heugimja-juk starts with washing, soaking, and draining black sesame and rice separately. Black sesame seeds are then toasted over low heat, and mixed with rice and water, to be ground in a millstone or a blender. The ground mixture is sifted, and simmered.

See also 
 Jatjuk
 Zhimahu
 List of sesame seed dishes

References

Juk
Sesame dishes